The Ichari Dam is a concrete gravity dam on the Tons River  north of Dakpathar in Uttarakhand, India. The primary purpose of the dam is hydroelectric power production and it is a run-of-the-river-type. It was completed in 1972. The dam diverts water to the Chibro Power Station (240 MW) which is then returned to the Tons River before being fed to the Khodri Power Station (120 MW).

Design and operation
The dam's spillway is located across its crest and is controlled by seven floodgates.

Chibro Power Plant
There, the water powers four 60 MW Francis turbine-generators. The plant was commissioned in 1975 and was the first power plant built underground in Northern India.
Made by

Khodri Power Plant
There, the water powers four 30 MW Francis turbine-generators before being discharged into a tail-race channel behind the Dakpathar Barrage. The plant was commissioned in January 1984.

See also

List of power stations in India

References

Dams completed in 1972
Dams in Uttarakhand
Gravity dams
Dams on the Yamuna River
1972 establishments in Uttar Pradesh
Energy infrastructure completed in 1984
Energy infrastructure completed in 1975
Run-of-the-river power stations
Underground power stations
20th-century architecture in India